Life Festival is an annual Irish music festival held in Belvedere House and Gardens in Westmeath, Ireland, with arts activities and street performers, from jugglers, fire breathers to magicians. There is a healing area for massage, yoga workshops and reiki.

Awards
 Best Irish Dance Festival in the first Irish Festival Awards in 2007 and 2009.
 Nominated for the top 10 Small Festivals in the European Festival Awards 2009.
 Best Dance Festival in Ireland (2007-2009-2010-2011-2012).
 Top 10 Best Small Festivals of Europe (2010)
 RA Top 10 Festivals May (2010-2011-2012).

Life Festival 
Life Festival originated in Charleville Castle in 2006, it has gone on to become regarded as the premier underground electronic music event in Ireland.

Events
The 2006 event was held at Charleville Castle, around 500 people attended.
2007 and 2008 event held in Lough Cutra Castle (Gort – Galway), capacity increased to 2000 people.
2009 festival took place from 16–19 July 2009. Tickets cost £125 for the weekend, and tickets sold out on 14 July. The location for 2009's festival was Lough Cutra Castle. By moving to the new location (closer to Dublin), Life festival started to grow in attendance numbers.

The 2010 festival took place 29–31 May at Belvedere House Park and Gardens (Mullingar – Co. WestMeath).
2011 tickets went on sale on 12 January 2011. The festival took place on 27–29 May 2011.  
2012 festival took place on the 25th to 27 May 2012, at Belvedere house.
2013 festival took place on the 24th to 26 May 2013, at Belvedere House.

Change of site
Life festival has moved venue four times. Started in Charleville Castle (2006) then Lough Cutra Castle (Gort, Co. Galway) during 2007–2008, Ballinlough Castle (2009) and its home Belvedere House (Mullingar, Co. Westmeath) 2009.

Festival director Fernando Martin confirmed on 17 February 2013 that despite the rumours venue remains at Belvedere House, Park &Gardens.

Music 
The festival's music genre is a mix of traditional music instruments backed with an electronic pulse, including live bands and Electronica: Psytrance, Dubstep, Drum&Bass, Techno, Reggae, Dub, Electro, Breaks, Minimal, and Progressive. 
 2006: (9–11 June):  Hilight tribe, Peaking Goddess Collective, CPU, Aphid Moon..
 2007 (15–17 June):: Dreadzone, Grooverider, Long Range, Krafty Kutz, and e-Skilz.
 2008 (4–6 July): Finley Quay, Hallucinogen, Cold Cut, Dj Marky, Skream, Mala, Jape, Max Romeo.
 2009 (20–22 July): Carl Craig, Green Velvet, Astrix, Goldie, Sebastien Leger, Altern8, Oscar Mulero, Andrew Weatherall, Daydin, Kindzadza, Caspa
 2010 (18–20 May):  Infected Mushroom, (Old School set), Ricardo Villalobos, Chris Liebing, LTJ Bukem, Mc Conrad, Ben Sims, Surgeon, a.k.a. Frequency7, Mad Professor, Joker, Mc Nomad, Hilight Tribe, The Japanese Popstars, Boris Divider, Zion Train, Ancient Methods, Hatcha, Doc Scott, Massi DL, Neil Landstrumm, Exium .... and many many more...
 2011 (16–19 May): Vitalic, Jeff Mills ( First ever Irish Festival show), John Digweed, Dr. Lektroluv, Slam, Johnny Clarke (Jamaica) with full Live Band, Youngsta, X-Dream VS The Delta (retro 90's set), Juno Reactor (dj set), Cafe Del Mar Positive, Ramadanman, Sandwell District, The Orb soundsystem, Ed Rush, Michael Prophet full Live Band, Zoo Project Ibiza party by the lake, Slam, mUmU party presents: Clive Henry (mUmu -Circoloco) & Dan Ghenacia ....
 2012 (25–27 May): Ben Klock vs Marcel Dettmann, Jamie Jones, DJ Marky, Planetary Assault Systems, Engine-Earz Experiment, Matthias Tanzmann, Blawan, Emalkay, Martyn, Ace Ventura, Simphonix, Doc Daneeka & Benjamin Damage, Cosmin TRG, Lovebirds, Koxbox, Synkro, Ed Davenport, Nicholas, San Soda, Jovani, Bad Tango, Louie Cut, Kryptic Minds, Distance, Kasra, Loxy, Randall, King Kong Company, Arron Nolan and many more..
2013 (24-26 May): Groove Armada DJ Set, Seth Troxler, Modeselektor Live, Amon Tobin Presents Two Fingers (DJ Set), Booka Shade Live, Kerri Chandler, Karenn, Jacques Greene, Boddika, Floating Points, KiNK, Bicep, GMS,  MMOTHS, Truss/MPIA3, Midland, Captain Hook, Frank B, Icicle, Ben Pearce, Calibre, Funkineven, The Cujo Family, The Hot Sprockets, Raglans, Alexander Nut Fatima, CLU, Goth Trad Looney Moon Rec,s Biome, White Collar Boy Rootical Sound System, All City and more...
2014 (23-25 May): Groove Armada DJ set, Four Tet, LFO, DJ Koze, Tensnake, Dixon, Joy O, Nina Kraviz, Nathan Fake, Waze & Odyssey, Kormac’s Big Band, New Jackson, Ejeca, Maya Jane Coles, Ben Klock, Ben Pearce, Parasense, Egorythmia, Sunil SHarpe, Frank B, Lumigraph, Nathan Jones, Slow Burn, Lunar Disco and Apartment Records
2015  (29-25 May): NAS (PERFORMING ILLMATIC) ▪ GOLD PANDA ▪ SIRIUSMODESELEKTOR ▪ SQUAREPUSHER ▪ EATS EVERYTHING ▪ DERRICK CARTE ▪ PANTHA DU PRINCE ▪ DJ NU-MARK ▪ SKREAM ▪ OPTIMO ▪ THE UNDERACHIEVERS ▪ TEN WALLS ▪ BEN KLOCK ▪ RATKING ▪ BEN UFO ▪ ALLE FARBEN ▪ HAPPA ▪ KOLSCH (DJ) ▪ THE MAGICIAN ▪ MOTOR CITY DRUM ENSEMBLE ▪ ROBERT HOOD ▪ BLONDE ▪ AME ▪ HIGH CONTRAST SUNIL SHARPE ▪ ONEMAN ▪ LUKE VIBERT ▪ KIDNAP KID ▪ ICICLE ▪ THE HEATWAVE ▪ JASPER JAMES
2016 (27-29 May): Paul Kalkbrenner / 2Many Djs / Jamie Jones / Laurent Garnier / Jeff Mills / Hot Since 82 / Mano le Tough / Ben Klock. John Talabot / Cyril Hahn / Patrick Topping / Blawan / Joy Orbison / Ejeca.Huxle / Bicep / Martyn / Krystal Klear / Virgina [Live] / Feat Steffi & Dexter / Terriers [live] / Truss / Sunil Sharpe / New Jackson [live] / The Drifter / Lumigraph / Terriers Live / Sias dj / Barry Redsetta and more… 
2017 (26-28 May): Nina Kraviz -Ricardo Villalobos - Dixon - Maya Jane Coles - Eat Everything - Recondite - Sunil Sharpe - Regis - David Rodigan - Solardo - DJ EZ -Duke Dumont - Rudimental - Patrick Topping - Alan Fitzpatrick - Gorgon City - Bjarki - Paula Temple -  The Magician - Format: B - Goldie - Jay Clarke - Veronica Vasicka - Monki -Cleric - Anetha - DJ Deece - DeFeKT - Phil Kieran - Aeron - Artur Bruce Janson - Aux Fnx - Baliboc -Bedlam Events - Betty Jimenez - Bodytonic Djs -  Boots & Cats - Cailín - Charlie - Chaz & shee - Ciara Brady - Dylan Stephenson - Eavan - Ed Fay - Frankie Moorhouse - and more ...
2018 (25-27 May): Fatboy Slim, along with Armand Van Helden, Bugzy Malone, Jax Jones, Jeff Mills, Amelie Lens, Mall Grab, Mango X Mathman, Honey Dijon, Adam Beyer b2b Joseph Capriati, Eve, Sarah Mooney, Boots & Kats plus many more.
2019 (24-26 May):  Bicep, Mix & Fairbanks, MK, Green Velvet, Giggs, Camelphat, Le Boom, King Kong Company, Yxng Bane, Charlotte De Witte, Bodytonic DJs, Denis Sulta, Sally C, Boots & Kats, Oldskool, Sam Paganini, Eve, FJAAK, Ejeca, Kerri Chandler, Unknown T, KC Lights, Emma Jai, Paula Temple, the Hanley Brothers, Cooks But We’re Chefs, and many more. 
2020 (Cancelled due to COVID-19):Carl Cox, Eric Prydz - Fisher - Amelie Lens - blawan - Dj Boring - Kolsch - Mall Grab - Michael Bibi .....
2021 (Canceled due to COVID -19)
2022 (27-29 May) Lineup to be announced in January 2022

See also
List of electronic music festivals

References

External links
Life Festival official site
Lineup
Neutronyx (Neutronyx Stage)
Redbull review

Music festivals in Ireland
Folk festivals in Ireland
Electronic music festivals in Ireland
Music festivals established in 2006
Glastonbury Festival